Franco Costa may refer to:

 Franco Costa (footballer) (born 1991), Argentine footballer 
 Franco Costa (painter) (1935–2015), Italian painter
 Franco Costa (archbishop) (1904–1977), Italian Catholic archbishop